The National Film and Television School (NFTS) is a film, television and games school established in 1971 and based at Beaconsfield Studios in Beaconsfield, Buckinghamshire, England. It is featured in the 2021 ranking by The Hollywood Reporter of the top 15 International film schools.

Its community of students makes around a hundred and fifty films a year on courses that are over 90% practical and unlike courses offered at other UK film schools. As of 2021 it had over 500 students and about a fifteen hundred a year on its short courses delivered in Beaconsfield and at its hubs in Glasgow, Leeds and Cardiff. Beaconsfield Studios consists of film and television stages; animation and production design studios; edit suites; sound post-production facilities; a music recording studio and four dubbing theatres. The school completed an expansion and modernisation programme in early 2017 with new teaching facilities, a third cinema and a new 4K Television Studio.

The BBC stated that the NFTS was the "leading centre of excellence for education in film and television programme making", and noted that it was "relevant to the industry's present and future needs." British Film Magazine once described the NFTS as being one of the few schools to come "very, very close" to guaranteeing a job in the film industry, and named its leader (Powell) a "maverick"; Filmmaking.net named it one of two films schools outside the US which had such a high international reputation.

NFTS student films have been nominated for an Oscar three times in the last six years. Additionally, in 2017 NFTS graduation film, A Love Story, directed and co-written by Anushka Naanayakkara, won the British Short Animation BAFTA at the EE British Academy Film Awards, making it the fourth year in a row that NFTS students have picked up this accolade. This is the second consecutive year that two of NFTS students' graduation films competed for the same prize, with A Love Story up against The Alan Dimension directed and co-written by Jac Clinch. NFTS student films are regularly selected for the top film festivals around the world. In 2016–17 highlights included selections at Cannes and Annecy Animation Festival and top prizes in nearly all the Royal Television Society categories for which they are eligible.

In 2018, the school was the recipient of the "BAFTA Outstanding British Contribution to Cinema Award" at the 71st British Academy Film Awards.

History

The National Film School opened in 1971, the work of four years of planning to create an institution to train personnel for the British film industry. Department of Education and Science had in 1967 recommended the creation of a national film school for the UK, and in 1969 an inquiry led by Lord Lloyd of Hampstead began to develop plans. Colin Young CBE became the founding director in 1971, a post he held for more than 2 decades, at a time when the school produced alumni including Bill Forsyth, Terence Davies, Julien Temple, Beeban Kidron, and Nick Park.

In 2016, the NFTS announced it had received funding to increase the capacity of its site in Beaconsfield including a '4K Digital Content Production Training Studio' (a refit of the 1960s TV studio) and the addition of a number of new MA and diploma courses including Directing & Producing Natural History & Science; Production Technology; Marketing for Film, TV & Games; Graphics & Titles for Television & Film and Creative Business for Entrepreneurs & Executives. In April 2017, it was announced that Nik Powell was to step down as Director of the school, with Jon Wardle succeeding him in the role.

The NFTS holds yearly graduation shows at the Picturehouse Central in Soho, and they were previously held at the BFI Southbank (formerly known as the National Film Theatre). These are highly selective and invite-only events which showcase the students' projects to scouts and industry professionals, ensuring that the students receive maximum exposure.

Awards and nominations

Alumni of the National Film and Television School have gone on to win Oscars, BAFTAs and Emmys as well as film festival prizes from around the world. In the last 6 years student films The Confession (2011), Head Over Heels (2013), The Bigger Picture (2015) have gone on to be nominated for three Oscars, and the graduation film A Love Story won the 2017 BAFTA for Best Short Animation, the fourth year in a row an NFTS animation has won the category.

In 2013 the NFTS graduation film "Miss Todd" won the Student Academy Award for Best Foreign Film presented by Academy of Motion Picture Arts and Sciences. This marked the sixth time the NFTS had won in this category, more than any other Film School outside of the United States. In 2016, The National Film and Television School once again affirmed its place as the number one international film school by winning accolades in all three categories in the CILECT Prize, the global film school awards. The NFTS won "Best Documentary" for The Archipelago, "Best Animation" for Edmond and was awarded second prize in the "Fiction" category for Patriot.

Facilities

The school's facilities were expanded in 2008 with the addition of new teaching spaces, public spaces and a new cinema, designed by Glenn Howells Architects. Upon its completion in 2008, the strikingly modern three-story building (see photo above) won a coveted RIBA prize. In June 2009 it was formally named The Oswald Morris Building in honour of veteran cinematographer Ossie Morris.

Two new buildings and one refurbished building opened in January 2017. This included the refurbishment of the 4K Digital Content Production Training Studio, located in the original 1960s TV studio which was completely refurbished with state-of-the-art equipment. In July 2017 this building was named the "Sky Studios at the NFTS" building, with the Production Galleries named "The Sony Gallery". This studio is primarily used by the Camera, Sound & Vision Mixing for Television Production diploma course and the Directing and Producing Television Entertainment MA course.

Inside the "Channel 4 Rose Building", there are new facilities for the Games Design and Development and Digital Effects MA courses, as well as an extra cinema, café and incubation space to enable graduates to start new businesses and accommodate new ground-breaking courses, enhancing the NFTS' already diverse programme.

A new teaching block on the north of the site houses a new studio, edit suites, dedicated suites for the Sound Design MA and Graphics and Titles for Film and Television diploma courses, as well as multi-purpose teaching spaces.

There are four dedicated stages on site:
 Stage 1 (Main Stage) –  (approx.) – traditional wooden floor film stage with permanent scenic cloth
 Studio 2 (TV Studio) –  (approx.) – concrete resin floor television studio
 Stage 3 (Rehearsal Stage) –  (approx.) – traditional wooden floor film stage
 Stage 4 (Teaching Block Stage) –  (approx.) – resin floor multi-purpose stage

There are also a number of dedicated spaces for animation and music recording.

Funding

Until its repeal in 1986, the school was funded partly through a tax on cinema ticket sales known as the Eady Levy, named after then UK Treasury official Sir Wilfred Eady. The NFTS has since been funded by the UK Government, via (today) the Department for Culture, Media and Sport, and the television and film industries.

Key Partner Sponsors include the Film Distributors' Association and the UK Cinema Association in addition to the main UK terrestrial and satellite broadcasting companies BBC, Channel 4, Sky, and ITV. In addition, a large number of public and private donors fund scholarships to assist British students.

Postgraduate students from the UK can now apply for a loan to help with their studies at any UK university including the NFTS via the Student Loans Company.

Courses of studies

Full-time MA courses
validated by the Royal College of Art:
Cinematography
Composing for Film and television
Creative Business for Entrepreneurs and Executives
Digital Effects
Directing Animation
Directing Documentary
Directing Fiction
Directing and Producing Science and Natural History
Directing and Producing Television Entertainment
Editing
Film Studies, Programming and Curation
Games Design and Development
Marketing, Distribution, Sales and Exhibition
Producing
Production Design
Production Technology
Screenwriting
Sound Design for Film and television

Diploma courses
Assistant Directing and Floor Managing
Assistant Camera (Focus Pulling and Loading)
Camera, Sound & Vision Mixing for Television Production
Creative Digital Producing
Directing Commercials and Promos
Factual Development and Production
Graphics and Titles for Film and television
Model Making for Animation
Production Accounting
Production Management for Film and television
Location Sound Recording for Film and Television
Script Development
Sports Production
Writing and Producing Comedy

Certificate courses
Filmmaking 
Character Animation
Virtual Production
Casting
Producing Your First Feature
Script Supervision and Continuity
Screenwriting: Finding Your Voice
Location Management for Film & TV

Short courses
Shortcourses@NFTS regularly run short courses for professionals working in the film and television industries – covering the following areas:
Factual
Drama
Business Skills
Camera & Sound
Editing
Craft & Technical
Multiplatform

Members
The school has around 110 full-time staff as well as many top tutors from within the industry.

Board
President: Lord Puttnam CBE
Chairman: Patrick McKenna
Director: Dr Jon Wardle
Governors:
Professor Geoffrey Crossick, University of London
Patrick Fueller
Sara Geater, All3Media
Caroline Hollick, Channel 4
Oli Hyatt, Blue-Zoo Productions
Ian Lewis, Sky Cinema
Andrew McDonald, DNA Films
Steve Mertz, Warner Bros.
Pukar Mehta, ITV Studios
Adil Ray OBE
Laurent Samara, Google, UK
Bal Samra
Rose Garnatt, BBC
Sue Vertue, Hartswood Films
Joe Bradbury-Walters, NFTS Staff governor

Partners
Platinum Partner Sponsor
Channel 4
Key Partner Sponsors
British Broadcasting Corporation
Film Distributors' Association
ITV
Sky
Key Partner Funders
Department for Digital, Culture, Media and Sport
HEFCE

Key tutors
Alex Garland – Associate Director
Brian Gilbert – Co-Head of Fiction
Lesley Manning – Co-Head of Fiction
Ian Sellar – Co-Head of Fiction
Peter Dale – Head of Documentary
Robert Bradbrook – Head of Animation
Brian Ward – Head of Screenwriting
Stuart Harris BSC – Co-Head of Cinematography
Oliver Stapleton BSC – Co-Head of Cinematography
Sandra Hebron – Head of Screen Arts
Bex Hopkins – Head of Production Management
John Keane – Head of Composing
John Lee – Head of Model Making
John Rowe – Head of Digital Effects
Richard Cox – Head of Editing
Alan Thorn – Head of Games Design and Development
Chris Auty – Head of Producing
Caroline Amies – Head of Production Design
David G. Croft – Head of Television Entertainment
Simon Clark – Head of Location Sound Recording
Chris Pow – Head of Sound Design
John Rowe – Head of Digital Effects
Clare Crean – Head of Marketing, Distribution, Sales and Exhibition
Alan Thorn – Head of Games

Chairs
Stephen Frears – David Lean Chair in Fiction Direction
Simon Beaufoy – Visiting Chair in Screenwriting
Brian Tufano – Visiting Chair in Cinematography

Honorary Fellows
The National Film and Television School has named more than 30 honorary fellows. The programme was founded in 1981, and ceremonies take place at the NTFS graduation ceremony each year. Honorary Fellows are recognised for their "outstanding contribution to the British film and television industry."

Honorary Fellows

The following are the Fellows, as of March 2020, where alumni of the NTFS are indicated by an asterisk (*):

Lord Attenborough, CBE
Amma Asante
Mark Baker
Sir Peter Bazalgette
Tim Bevan
Malorie Blackman, OBE*
Barbara Broccoli
Sir Michael Caine, CBE
Terence Davies*
Sir Roger Deakins, CBE*
Molly Dineen*
Greg Dyke
Eric Fellner
Paul Greengrass
Asif Kapadia
Duncan H. Kenworthy, OBE
Baroness Kidron, OBE*
Michael Kuhn
Sir David Lean, CBE
Ken Loach
Kim Longinotto*
Ossie Morris, CBE
Steve Morrison*
Nick Park, CBE*
Sir Alan Parker, CBE
Ashley Pharoah*
Lord Puttnam of Queensgate, CBE
Michael Radford*
Lynne Ramsay*
Jonathan Ross
Tessa Ross, CBE
Jack Valenti
Sally Wainwright
David Yates*
Colin Young

Other past fellow have included Lord Birkett, who died in April 2015.

Notable alumni (selection)

Animation
 Nick Park (Chicken Run, Wallace and Gromit)
 Mark Baker (Peppa Pig, Ben and Holly's Little Kingdom)
 Alison Snowden and David Fine (Bob and Margaret, Bob's Birthday)
 Tony Collingwood, Collingwood O'Hare Ltd, (Dennis the Menace, Yoko! Jakamoko! Toto!)
 Joan Ashworth (The Web, How Mermaids Breed, Seedfold Films, 3 Peach Animation, Professor of Animation Royal College of Art 1994 to 2015)

Cinematography
 Roger Deakins (Jarhead, A Beautiful Mind, Fargo)
 David Tattersall (Die Another Day,  Star Wars – Episodes I, II and III)
 Andrzej Sekuła (Pulp Fiction, American Psycho, Reservoir Dogs)
 Alwin H. Küchler (Code 46, The Mother, Ratcatcher, Morvern Callar)
 Eduard Grau (A Single Man, Buried, Suffragette, Boy Erased)

Directing (film)
 Mark Herman (Little Voice, Brassed Off)
 Michael Caton-Jones (Memphis Belle, This Boy's Life)
 Terence Davies (Distant Voices, Still Lives, The Neon Bible)
 Michael Radford (Il Postino, The Merchant of Venice)
 Lynne Ramsay (Ratcatcher, Morvern Callar)
 Julien Temple
 Joanna Hogg
 David Yates (Harry Potter)
 Beeban Kidron (Bridget Jones: The Edge of Reason, Hippie Hippie Shake)
 Anthony Waller (An American Werewolf in Paris, Mute Witness)
 Michael Lennox (A Patch of Fog, Boogaloo and Graham, Hives)
 Georgis Grigorakis (Digger)

Directing (television)
 Charles McDougall (Desperate Housewives, Queer As Folk, Hillsborough)
 David Yates (State of Play, Sex Traffic, The Girl in the Café)
 Toby Haynes (Doctor Who, Sherlock, Wallander)

Composing for film and television
 Natalie Ann Holt (Great Expectations,  The Honourable Woman, Paddington)
 Trevor Jones (Richard III, Brassed Off)
 Julian Nott (Wallace & Gromit: The Curse of the Were-Rabbit, The Wrong Trousers, A Grand Day Out)
 Dario Marianelli (The Brothers Grimm, V for Vendetta, Pride and Prejudice, Atonement, Anna Karenina)

Documentary
 Nick Broomfield (Kurt and Courtney, Aileen: Life and Death of a Serial Killer)
 John Burgan (Memory of Berlin)
 Molly Dineen (Home from the Hill, Heart of the Angel, Geri, The Ark)
 Kim Longinotto (Divorce Iranian Style, The Day I Will Never Forget, Sisters in Law, Hold Me Tight Let Me Go) (Rough Aunties)
 Sean McAllister (The Minders, Settlers, The Liberace of Baghdad)
 Sandhya Suri (I is for India)

Film editing
 Valerio Bonelli (Hannibal Rising, Cemetery Junction)
 Nicolas Chaudeurge (Red Road, Fish Tank, Wuthering Heights)
 Hoping Chen (Ilo Ilo)
 Bill Diver (Twenty Four Seven, Distant Voices, Still Lives)
 Nick Fenton (Nathan Barley, The Arbor, Submarine)
 David Freeman (The Full Monty, Clash of the Titans, Ill Manors)
 Daniel Greenway (Southcliffe, Call the Midwife)
 Peter Lambert (The Twilight Saga: New Moon)
 Helle le Fevre (Archipelago, Exhibition)
 Ewa J Lind (Far North, The Warrior)
 Alex Mackie (Downton Abbey, Judge Dredd, Wallander)
 Jamie McCoan (Doctor Who, Lewis, Kavanagh QC, Agatha Christie's Poirot, Goodnight Mister Tom)
 Úna Ní Dhonghaíle (Ripper Street, Vera, Doctor Who, Wallander, Quirke, Upstairs, Downstairs)
 Lucia Zucchetti (The Queen, Ratcatcher, The Merchant of Venice)

Producing
Michele Camarda (Wonderland, This Year's Love, Photographing Fairies)
Sebastian Cody (After Dark, The Secret Cabaret and other Open Media productions)
Ben Lock (Purple and Brown, Tiny Planets)
Rebekah Gilbertson (The Edge of Love, Patagonia)
Steve Morrison (My Left Foot, The Field, Jack and Sarah, co-founder All3Media

Screenwriting
András Gerevich  (Synchronoff)
Ashley Pharoah (Life on Mars)
Krysty Wilson-Cairns (1917, Last Night in Soho)

See also

 Film
 Glossary of motion picture terms

References

External links
 
 NFTS Animation Department website
 Exploring the potential of NFTs in the music industry
 Department for Culture, Media and Sport
 Quotas and Levies – explanation of various national film levies, including the Eady Levy

Film schools in England
Education in Buckinghamshire
Further education colleges in Buckinghamshire
1971 establishments in England
Educational institutions established in 1971
Beaconsfield
BAFTA Outstanding British Contribution to Cinema Award